Religious assimilation refers to the adoption of a majority or dominant culture's religious practices and beliefs by a minority or subordinate culture. It is an important form of cultural assimilation.

Religious assimilation includes the religious conversion of individuals from a minority faith to the dominant faith. It can also include the religious indoctrination of children into a dominant religion by their converted parents. However, religious assimilation need not involve wholesale adoption of a dominant religious belief system by a minority; the concept is broad enough to include alterations in the frequency of religious participation to match that of the dominant culture. Indeed, religious assimilation among immigrant groups most commonly involves such minor changes, rather than sweeping change in religious belief systems.

In sharp contrast to other aspects of cultural assimilation such as language and nationality, dominant cultures in general tend not to expect immigrants to adopt the dominant religion. Some researchers, such as Will Herberg, have advanced a thesis of perpetual religious pluralism, to the effect that immigrants would typically retain their religious affiliation even after complete cultural assimilation in other aspects of culture. Nevertheless, some dominant cultures may exert pressures for religious assimilation so extreme as to amount, according to some researchers, to a form of religious persecution. These pressures may be exerted by making other, more appealing forms of cultural assimilation, such as membership in secular social club activities, so time-consuming that they interfere seriously with attendance at minority religious services, and by discouraging expression of minority religious beliefs in public.

See also 
 Exclusivism
 Syncretism

References 

Religious conversion
Sociology of religion